WMKT (1270 AM) is a radio station licensed to Charlevoix, Michigan, broadcasting a talk radio format. The station also broadcasts on two FM translators on W272CR 102.3 (formerly 92.1) and W277DY 103.3 and streams online. The station features local programming with local news and weather forecasts by Nick Rhudy every weekday during the 6 AM to Noon hours. Nick Rhudy also has a daily, local radio show from 5 PM to 6 PM, "Talk of the North with Nick Rhudy. The rest of the station's lineup are from syndicated sources. The station is a Fox News Radio affiliate.

References

External links

MKT
Radio stations established in 1986
1986 establishments in Michigan